Akkain (Aqqayın) is a rural locality (a village) in Metevbashevsky Selsoviet, Belebeyevsky District, Bashkortostan, Russia. The population was 149 as of 2010. There is 1 street.

Geography 
Akkain is located 27 km north of Belebey (the district's administrative centre) by road. Metevbash is the nearest rural locality.

References 

Rural localities in Belebeyevsky District